Jhazmyne's Lullaby is the only studio album from Milwaukee metalcore band 7 Angels 7 Plagues. The cover art is a nod to Miles Davis Volume 2.

Reception
According to AllMusic, Jhazmyne's Lullabye'' is a "powerful metalcore album that finds strength in solid lyrical content." In his review of the album, writer Kevin Stewart-Panko said the band "construct songs that hardcore kids will hurt themselves to without realising how much of a jazz influence goes into 7A7P's style and graphic design. They beat down the restrictive walls of what can go onto a hardcore record with the inclusion of piano études and acoustic guitar solos."

Track listing
All music written and performed by 7 Angels 7 Plagues, except where noted.

Personnel 
7 Angels 7 Plagues
 Kyle Johnson - bass
 Jared Logan - drums, percussion
 Matt Matera - guitar
 Matt Mixon - vocals
 Ryan Morgan - guitar

Production and recording
 Produced by 7 Angel 7 Plagues and CHIN for CHINCORE Productions
 Songs 1-8 engineered by CHIN at Bionic Studios in Milwaukee, WI
 Song 9 engineered by Jared Logan at the Mirimar Theatre in Milwaukee, WI
 Assistant Engineers: Jared Logan and DJ Malcomb
 Mastered by Trevor Sadler at Mastermind Productions, Milwaukee, WI

Artwork and design 
 Art Direction & Design: Martin Defatte for Guerrilla Digital
 Photography: Nate Baker @ minno9.com, Brian Dally, & Martin Defatte

References 

2001 debut albums
7 Angels 7 Plagues albums